Ocean Tomo is an intellectual property merchant bank that provides financial products and services, including expert testimony, valuation, research, ratings, investments, risk management, and transactions.  They are headquartered in Chicago, Illinois, USA. They also have offices in Greenwich, San Francisco and Houston. Ocean Tomo is the founder of the Intellectual Property Exchange International (IPXI). Their current Chairman and CEO is James E. Malackowski.

Auctions
Ocean Tomo introduced the world's first public auctions of patents, trademarks and copyrights.  The auctions have included business method patents and the rights to Jimi Hendrix's music recordings. In 2009, the Ocean Tomo transactions division was acquired by ICAP through a newly created company, ICAP Ocean Tomo, later renamed ICAP Patent Brokerage.

References

Intellectual property organizations
Patent monetization companies of the United States
Open innovation intermediaries